A pharmakós (plural pharmakoi) in Ancient Greek religion was the ritualistic sacrifice or exile of a human scapegoat or victim.

Ritual
A slave, a cripple, or a criminal was chosen and expelled from the community at times of disaster (famine, invasion or plague) or at times of calendrical crisis. It was believed that this would bring about purification. On the first day of the Thargelia, a festival of Apollo at Athens, two men, the pharmakoi, were led out as if to be sacrificed as an expiation.

Some scholia state that pharmakoi were actually sacrificed (thrown from a cliff or burned), but many modern scholars reject this, arguing that the earliest source for the pharmakos (the iambic satirist Hipponax) shows the pharmakoi being beaten and stoned, but not executed. A more plausible explanation would be that sometimes they were executed and sometimes not, depending on the attitude of the victim. For instance, a deliberate unrepentant murderer would most likely be put to death.

In Aesop in Delphi (1961), Anton Wiechers discussed the parallels between the legendary biography of Aesop (in which he is unjustly tried and executed by the Delphians) and the pharmakos ritual. For example, Aesop is grotesquely deformed, as was the pharmakos in some traditions; and Aesop was thrown from a cliff, as was the pharmakos in some traditions.

Gregory Nagy, in Best of the Achaeans (1979), compared Aesop's pharmakos death to the "worst" of the Achaeans in the Iliad, Thersites. More recently, both Daniel Ogden, The Crooked Kings of Ancient Greece (1997) and Todd Compton, Victim of the Muses: Poet as Scapegoat, Warrior and Hero (2006) examine poet pharmakoi. Compton surveys important poets who were exiled, executed or suffered unjust trials, either in history, legend or Greek or Indo-European myth.

Modern interpretations

Walter Burkert and René Girard have written influential modern interpretations of the pharmakos rite. Burkert shows that humans were sacrificed or expelled after being fed well, and, according to some sources, their ashes were scattered to the ocean. This was a purification ritual, a form of societal catharsis. Girard likewise discusses the connection between catharsis, sacrifice, and purification. Some scholars have connected the practice of ostracism, in which a prominent politician was exiled from Athens after a vote using pottery pieces, with the pharmakos custom. However, the ostracism exile was only for a fixed time, as opposed to the finality of the pharmakos execution or expulsion.

Pharmakos is also used as a vital term in Derridean deconstruction. In his essay "Plato's Pharmacy", Jacques Derrida deconstructs several texts by Plato, such as Phaedrus, and reveals the inter-connection between the word chain pharmakeia–pharmakon–pharmakeus and the notably absent word pharmakos. In doing so, he attacks the boundary between inside and outside, declaring that the outside (pharmakos, never uttered by Plato) is always-already present right behind the inside (pharmakeia–pharmakon–pharmakeus). As a concept, Pharmakos can be said to be related to other Derridian terms such as "Trace".

See also
 Etymology of pharmacy
 Modes of persuasion, which include ethos, pathos, logos and kairos

Notes

References
Bremmer, Jan N., "Scapegoat Rituals in Ancient Greece", Harvard Studies in Classical Philology, Vol. 87. (1983), pp. 299–320.
Burkert, Walter, Greek Religion, Cambridge, MA: Harvard University Press, 1985.
Burkert, Walter, Structure and History in Greek Mythology. Berkeley: University of California Press, 1979, 59-77.
Calcagnetti, Daniel J., "Neuropharmacology: From Cellular Receptors and Neurotransmitter Synthesis to Neuropathology & Drug Addiction", First Edition, 2006.
Compton, Todd, “The Pharmakos Ritual: Testimonia.”
Compton, Todd, Victim of the Muses: Poet as Scapegoat, Warrior and Hero in Greco-Roman and Indo-European Myth and History. Washington, D.C.: Center for Hellenic Studies/Harvard University Press, 2006.
Derrida, Jacques, "Dissemination", translated by Barbara Johnson, Chicago, University of Chicago Press, 1981.
Fiore, Robert L., "Alarcon's El dueno de las estrellas: Hero and Pharmakos", Hispanic Review, Vol. 61, No. 2, Earle Homage Issue (Spring, 1993), pp. 185–199.
Frazer, James. The Golden Bough. Part VI. The Scapegoat, pp. 252ff.
Girard, René. The Scapegoat. Trans. Y. Freccero. Baltimore, 1986.
Harrison, Jane Ellen, Epilegomena to the Study of Greek Religion, 1921.
Harrison, Jane Ellen, Prolegomena to the Study of Greek Religion, 1908.
Harrison, Jane Ellen, Themis: a Study of the Social Origin of Greek Religion, 1921.
Hirayama, Koji, Stoning in the Pharmakos Ritual, Journal of Classical Studies, XLIX(2001), Classical Society of Japan, Kyoto University.
Hughes, Dennis, Human Sacrifice in Ancient Greece, London 1991, pp. 139–165.
Litwa, M David, 'The Pharmakos,' chapter 11 in How the Gospels became history: Jesus and Mediterranean myths, Synkrisis. New Haven: Yale University Press, 2019; pp.156-68.
Nagy, Gregory. The Best of the Achaeans: Concepts of the Hero in Archaic Greek Poetry. The Johns Hopkins University Press, 1979, pp. 280–90 in print edition.
Nilsson, Martin P., Greek Popular Religion, 1940. See the discussion of the Thargelia in the chapter “Rural Customs and Festivals.”
Ogden, Daniel, The Crooked Kings of Ancient Greece London 1997, pp. 15–46.
Parker, Robert, Miasma, Pollution and Purification in Early Greek Religion. Oxford: Oxford University Press, 1983, pp. 24–26, 257-280.
Rinella, Michael A., Pharmakon:  Plato, Drug Culture, and Identity in Ancient Athens. Lanham, MD:  Lexington Books, 2010, 73-74.
 Whibley, Leonard, MA, A Companion to Greek Studies. Cambridge University Press.
Wiechers, A. Aesop in Delphi. Meisenheim am Glan 1961.

Injustice
Ancient Greek religion